Allen Garfield Nichols (October 28, 1916 – June 1981) was an American football fullback who played one season with the Pittsburgh Steelers of the National Football League. He played college football at Temple University and attended Avalon High School in Avalon, Pennsylvania.

References

External links
Just Sports Stats

1916 births
1981 deaths
Players of American football from Pittsburgh
American football fullbacks
Temple Owls football players
Pittsburgh Steelers players